Reedsburg is a city in Sauk County, Wisconsin, United States. Located along the Baraboo River, it was founded in 1868, and was named for early settler David C. Reed. The city is surrounded by the Town of Reedsburg. It is part of the Baraboo Micropolitan Statistical Area.

History

Early settlement 
Early settlers came to this area due to the abundance of natural resources, especially lumber. In 1844, the first copper mine was established in this area, but it was soon abandoned. James W. Babb and his wife Rebecca Scarff Babb are the earliest recorded settlers, having brought their family to Wisconsin from Ohio in 1845. At a place 55 miles northeast of Mineral Point (the capital of Wisconsin Territory), long identified by the Winnebago who inhabited these lands as a convenient place to cross the Baraboo River, Babb left a flat-bottomed boat to help move supplies. 

At "Babb's Ford," in 1847 David C. Reed built a dam and a shanty to house the workers who constructed it. In June 1848 a sawmill followed. By 1850, "Shanty Row" comprised five tamarack shanties. These initial buildings were of poor construction, and did not have a strong foundation, due to the marshland created by the Baraboo River. Main Street would later be built where "Shanty Row" stood. 

Reedsburg was platted in 1852, and four years later the community had grown to 50 buildings housing 27 families and 122 people. The first bridge across the Baraboo River was built in 1853, located where the Main Street bridge would later be built. In 1854 the Mackey brothers purchased Reed's saw mill, and brought economic security to the area. As the town was growing, more farms continued to be developed around the area, cultivating a variety of crops.

Late 1800s 
The community continued under town government until 1868, when Reedsburg was incorporated as a village; it became a city in May 1887. In the 1860s, a hop boom temporarily brought wealth into the area. After the crash of the hops market, more farms started to diversify, and Reedsburg would become known for its grain and dairy products. The Chicago & North Western Railway (C&NW) arrived in 1872.   

In the 1870s, Main Street started to develop, with grocery stores, banks, and other businesses establishing in Reedsburg. In 1880, the Reedsburg Brewing Company was formed. As the city continued to grow, more industries came to Reedsburg. On December 1, 1883, the Webb and Schweke department store opened, known as the "Big Store". The store was the largest department store in Sauk County. The City Hotel opened in 1886, owned by William Roper. Among the most important was the Reedsburg Woolen Mill. Construction was completed in 1882, and by 1899, 32 broad looms produced mainly "fancy cassimeres" for Chicago markets.

1900s 
In 1902 the facility was purchased by Appleton Woolen Mills, and began producing clothing for east coast outlets. Sears and Montgomery Wards became two major clients. In 1910, the Central Wisconsin Creamery opened, making Reedsburg famous for its butter production. In 1954, when Appleton Woolen Mills shifted focus to felts, the business in Reedsburg reorganized to emphasize novelty fabrics. The Big Store burned down in 1957, after 78 years of service. The Reedsburg Woolen Mill, long one of the area's largest employers, endured until 1967; most of the mill complex burned in April 1968, leaving only the mill office.  

Another important business has been the Hankscraft Company.  Incorporated in Madison in 1920, Hankscraft—makers of baby bottle warmers, sterilizers and other products—thrived during the post-war baby boom, and in 1949 opened a plant in Reedsburg. In 1951, Herbert Webb left Reedsburg a $300,000 trust fund, which is equivalent to over 4 million dollars, adjusted for inflation. He then created Webb Park, and Webb High School on the northeast side of Reedsburg, before his death in 1954. In 1961, Hankscraft purchased Nursmatic Corporation, expanding their line include to bassinets, safety harnesses, baby toiletries and other products; a year later, the acquisition of Ruzicka Laboratories allowed the firm to expand once more, adding vaporizer fluids, baby oil, shampoo and lotions.  In 1970, Hankscraft was purchased by Gerber Products Company, and began producing baby food.  It was the town's second largest employer, exceeded only by the Reedsburg Woolen Mill.  

In the 1980s, the Wisconsin and Southern Railroad came to Reedsburg, having purchased the old C&NW railroad track. In 1996, Gerber Products Company sold Hankscraft Motors, which continues to operate in Reedsburg. Other important industries have included Grede Foundry, Seats, Inc., and the Columbia Par Car Corporation.

In 1971, the first Butter Festival, now known as Butterfest, was held in Webb Park. It was a celebration of the farming and dairy industry. In 1984, together the Main Street Commercial Historic District and the Park Street Historic District were added to the National Register of Historic Places. In 1993, 22 miles of the C&NW rail line between Reedsburg and Elroy became the Wisconsin 400 State Trail, a hiking/biking trail named for the passenger rail line that was said to travel the 400 miles between Chicago and Minneapolis/St. Paul in 400 minutes.

2000s 
In 2011, Reedsburg became home of the annual Fermentation Fest. In 2018, the Baraboo River flooded, destroying several homes and businesses.

Geography 
Reedsburg is located at  (43.533854, -90.002902).

The Baraboo River flows through the city.

Lake Virginia is a small lake on the east side of Reedsburg. Lake Redstone and Dutch Hollow Lake are 2 reservoirs located in the nearby town of La Valle. Babb Creek, Hay Creek, and Copper Creek, tributaries of the Baraboo River, all flow through Reedsburg. Babb Creek was named for early settler James W. Babb. Hay and Copper Creek were named for the farming and short lived mining industry in Reedsburg. 

Reedsburg is 12 miles southwest of the Wisconsin Dells along the Baraboo River, with scenic views of the Baraboo Range to the south. Reedsburg is located directly on the 90th meridian west. A pink quartzite marker on Main Street reads 325 feet east of this point lies the 90th meridian. The marker was dedicated on October 14, 1963, to designate Reedsburg's unique location. It was donated by Whitney Memorials and erected by the Kiwanis Club.

Demographics

2020 census 
As of the census of 2020, the population was 9,984. The racial makeup of the city was 88.3% White, 1.3% Black or African American, 1.0% Native American, 0.7% Asian, 3.7% from other races, and 5.0% from two or more races. Ethnically, the population was 7.2% Hispanic or Latino of any race.

2010 census 
As of the census of 2010, there were 9,200 people, 3,795 households, and 2,357 families residing in the city. The racial makeup of the city was 95.3% White, 0.6% African American, 1.0% Native American, 0.4% Asian, 1.6% from other races, and 1.1% from two or more races. Hispanic or Latino of any race were 4.3% of the population.

There were 3,795 households, of which 34.5% had children under the age of 18 living with them, 46.0% were married couples living together, 11.2% had a female householder with no husband present, 5.0% had a male householder with no wife present, and 37.9% were non-families. 31.9% of all households were made up of individuals, and 14.9% had someone living alone who was 65 years of age or older. The average household size was 2.41 and the average family size was 3.04.

The median age in the city was 35.7 years. 27% of residents were under the age of 18; 7.5% were between the ages of 18 and 24; 28.2% were from 25 to 44; 22.4% were from 45 to 64; and 14.9% were 65 years of age or older. The gender makeup of the city was 48.4% male and 51.6% female.

2000 census 
As of the census of 2000, there were 7,827 people, 3,193 households, and 2,021 families residing in the city. The population density was 1,503.9 people per square mile (581.2/km2). There were 3,380 housing units 251.0/km2 (649.4/sq mi). The racial makeup of the city was 97.44% White, 0.17% Black or African American, 0.79% Native American, 0.19% Asian, 0.01% Pacific Islander, 0.61% from other races, and 0.78% from two or more races. 1.58% of the population were Hispanic or Latino of any race.

There were 3,193 households, out of which 32.9% had children under the age of 18 living with them, 49.1% were married couples living together, 9.8% had a female householder with no husband present, and 36.7% were non-families. 29.8% of all households were made up of individuals, and 14.5% had someone living alone who was 65 years of age or older. The average household size was 2.41 and the average family size was 13.01.

In the city, the population was spread out, with 26.7% under the age of 18, 8.5% from 18 to 24, 30.3% from 25 to 44, 18.2% from 45 to 64, and 16.2% who were 65 years of age or older. The median age was 35 years. For every 100 females, there were 92.8 males. For every 100 females age 18 and over, there were 87.4 males.

The median income for a household in the city was $39,152, and the median income for a family was $44,329. Males had a median income of $33,211 versus $21,973 for females. The per capita income for the city was $18,828. About 5.5% of families and 7.5% of the population were below the poverty line, including 7.3% of those under age 18 and 8.1% of those age 65 or over.

Government 
Reedsburg operates under the mayor-council form of government, with each of four districts being represented by two aldermen, along with one at-large alderman. David Estes has served as the mayor since 2009. The city is managed by an appointed city administrator. The Reedsburg Police Department is the law enforcement agency in the city. The department was founded in 1868, and currently has 22 full time police officers.

Infrastructure 
The city includes the Main Street Commercial Historic District and the Park Street Historic District, which contain commercial and residential buildings built from 1873 to 1920. The Chicago and North Western Depot was built in 1906 which connected Reedsburg to the Twin Cities 400 line. Currently, it serves as the headquarters for the 400 State Trail, a biking and hiking trail that starts in Reedsburg and ends in Elroy, Wisconsin, following the old Twin Cities 400 track. Sound Devices is headquartered in Reedsburg.

Parks 
Reedsburg has 18 parks within the city. City Park is the oldest, being donated by the city's founder David C. Reed in 1848. Webb Park is another large park, being dedicated to Herbert H. Webb, a generous benefactor to Reedsburg. Webb Park includes the city's swimming pool, and is adjacent to Webb Middle School. The woods behind Webb Park is called the Roger Popple Nature Area, which includes several trails, and the Half-Moon Lagoon Disc Golf Course.

Transportation 
State Highways 33 and 23 run along Main Street. State Highway 136 terminates in Reedsburg. There is access to Interstate 90/94 nearby, and the city is served by the Reedsburg Municipal Airport (C35). Several city roads include bicycle lanes. The Wisconsin and Southern Railroad operates on the old C&NW track.

Education 
The School District of Reedsburg has four elementary schools serving students in kindergarten through grade 3, one intermediate school serving students in grade 3 through grade 5, one middle school, and one high school. There is a Madison Area Technical College regional campus on the west side of Reedsburg.

Notable people 

 Clare Briggs, comic strip artist
 Edward Dithmar, lieutenant governor of Wisconsin
 Alexander Preston Ellinwood, Wisconsin politician, businessman, and educator, lived in Reedsburg.
 John Harrington, professional football player
 Charlie Kavanagh, MLB player
Timothy Mahr, composer and conductor, professor of music at St. Olaf College
Agnes Moorehead, actress
Saul Phillips, head coach of the North Dakota State Bison men's basketball team
Albert O. Sorge, Wisconsin State Representative
Henry W. Sorge, Wisconsin State Representative
Warren Weaver, scientist

References

External links 

City of Reedsburg
Reedsburg Public Library
Sanborn fire insurance maps: 1885 1892 1898 1904 1912 1918

 
Cities in Wisconsin
Cities in Sauk County, Wisconsin